Coincya richeri is a plant species in the family Brassicaceae.

Description
This perennial herbaceous plant has a leafy stem and a basal rosettes of oblong-ovate leaves with a long petiole and serrated edges. The pods are crossed by three ribs. They bloom from June to August.

Distribution
This plant is endemic to the Western Alps from Monte Viso to Mont Cenis.

Habitat

References

External links
Biolib
The Plant List
Flora of Besancon
Luirig.altervista

richeri